Sibselmash is a company based in Novosibirsk, Russia. It is currently part of the Rostec group.

History
Sibselmash was established in the 1930s as Kombinat 179 to produce agricultural machinery. During World War II, the factory was converted to shell production, manufacturing 48 million shells during wartime.

Products
Sibselmash has produced light ammunition and small rockets for the military. It also produces agricultural machinery for the civilian economy. The company entered bankruptcy proceedings in 2012.

References

External links
 Official website

Manufacturing companies based in Novosibirsk
Leninsky District, Novosibirsk
Rostec
Ministry of the Defense Industry (Soviet Union)
Defence companies of the Soviet Union